Tyler Graovac (born April 27, 1993) is a Canadian professional ice hockey player. He is currently playing with HC Vityaz of the Kontinental Hockey League (KHL). Graovac was selected by the Minnesota Wild in the 7th round (191st overall) of the 2011 NHL Entry Draft.

Playing career
Graovac played four seasons of major junior hockey in the Ontario Hockey League (OHL) with the Ottawa 67's and Belleville Bulls, registering a total of 58 goals, 72 assists, and 76 penalty minutes, in 228 OHL games. He was recognized for his outstanding play when, following his final year, he was awarded the William Hanley Trophy as the OHL's most sportsmanlike player, and was further honoured when he was named 2012–13 Canadian Hockey League (CHL) Sportsman of the Year.

On April 2, 2013, the Minnesota Wild signed Graovac to a three-year, two-way entry-level contract worth $750,000.

In the 2014–15 season, his second professional season, Graovac made his NHL debut with the Wild on December 29, 2014 against the Winnipeg Jets.

On October 5, 2016, he was placed on waivers by the Wild.

On June 14, 2017, he was traded by the Wild to the Washington Capitals in exchange for a fifth-round pick in the 2018 NHL Entry Draft. Graovac opened the 2017–18 season on the Capitals roster, however appeared in just 5 scoreless games before he was waived and reassigned to AHL affiliate, the Hershey Bears for the remainder of the season.

On July 1, 2018, having left the Capitals as a free agent, Graovac was signed to a one-year, two-way contract with the Calgary Flames. In the 2018–19 season, Graovac played exclusively with the Flames' AHL affiliate, the Stockton Heat. In 65 games with the Heat, he led the team with 24 goals, finishing second in points with 50.

Unable to earn a recall with the Flames, Graovac left as a free agent at the conclusion of his contract. On July 1, 2019, Graovac agreed to a one-year, two-way contract with fellow Canadian club, the Vancouver Canucks. Following the Canucks training camp, Graovac was sent to their AHL affiliate, the Utica Comets. He was recalled to the Canucks on November 13. Graovac scored two goals in eight games with the Canucks before leaving a December 1 game against the Edmonton Oilers due to a long-term lower-body injury.

On December 13, 2020, the Vancouver Canucks re-signed Graovac to a one-year, two-way contract. After attending the Canucks training camp, Graovac was initially assigned to the Utica Comets. On January 20, 2021, Graovac was re-assigned by the Canucks to the Winnipeg Jets AHL affiliate, the Manitoba Moose, due to shorter quarantine recall regulations. He contributed with 9 points in as many games with the Moose before returning to the Canucks and contributing with 3 goals and 4 points in 14 games.

As a free agent from the Canucks, Graovac left the NHL and signed his first contract abroad in agreeing to a one-year deal with Belarusian based club, HC Dinamo Minsk of the KHL, on July 26, 2021.

At the conclusion of his contract with Minsk, Graovac continued in the KHL in joining Russian based club, HC Vityaz, on a one-year contract on July 27, 2022.

Career statistics

Awards and honours

References

External links

1993 births
Belleville Bulls players
Canadian ice hockey centres
HC Dinamo Minsk players
Hershey Bears players
Ice hockey people from Ontario
Iowa Wild players
Living people
Manitoba Moose players
Minnesota Wild draft picks
Minnesota Wild players
Ottawa 67's players
Sportspeople from Brampton
Stockton Heat players
Utica Comets players
Vancouver Canucks players
HC Vityaz players
Washington Capitals players